Clavulinopsis helvola, commonly known as the yellow club fungus, is a mushroom in the family Clavariaceae.

References

External links
Video footage of the yellow club fungus

Clavariaceae
Fungi of Europe
Fungi described in 1797
Taxa named by Pier Andrea Saccardo